The Lindbergh Boom (1927–1929) is a period of rapid interest in aviation following the awarding of the Orteig Prize to Charles Lindbergh for his 1927 non-stop solo transatlantic flight in the Spirit of St. Louis. The Lindbergh Boom occurred during the interwar period between World War I and World War II, where aviation development was fueled by commercial interests rather than wartime necessity. During this period, dozens of companies were formed to create airlines, and aircraft for a new age in aviation. Many of the fledgling companies funded by stock went under as quick as they started as the stock that capitalized them plummeted in value following the Wall Street Crash of 1929. The Great Depression dried up the market for new aircraft, causing many aircraft companies to go into bankruptcy or get consolidated by larger entities. Air racing, record attempts, and barnstorming remained popular, as aviators tried to recapture the prizes and publicity of Lindbergh's Transatlantic flight.

The Lindbergh Boom
Publicity surrounding Lindbergh and his flight boosted the aviation industry and made a skeptical public take air travel seriously. Within a year of his flight, a quarter of Americans (an estimated thirty million) personally saw Lindbergh and the Spirit of St. Louis. Over the remainder of 1927 applications for pilot's licenses in the U.S. tripled, the number of licensed aircraft quadrupled, and U.S. Airline passengers grew between 1926 and 1929 by 3,000% from 5,782 to 173,405.

Contributing factors
Lindbergh's flight was the peak of several other factors that lead to the boom. This included:
 movie reels and newspaper-funded record attempts for publicity
 the introduction of reliable, high-power-to-weight engines, such as the Wright Whirlwind
 the exhaustion of World War I-vintage aircraft engines and airframes
 the start of contract air mail routes in the United States, which subsidized new airline service
 the introduction of all-metal airliners like the Ford Trimotor that could carry enough revenue passengers to be profitable
 the completion of the lighted airway
 publicity events such as the National Air Races, and the nationwide Ford National Reliability Air Tour
 airplane service and cargo flights to the Caribbean to skirt the Volstead Act
 an influx of capital from a booming stock market.

The Boom companies

Ace Aircraft Manufacturing Corporation  1929–1930 
American Aeronautical Corporation - founded to license build Savoia-Marchetti seaplanes in 1928. The company folded after 1933.
Associated Aircraft Corporation 1929–1929 
Air Capital Manufacturing Company 1929–1929 
Beach Aviation Company 1927–1928  
Bowlby Airplane Company 1929–1929 
Braley Aircraft Company 1929–1931
Buckley Aircraft Co. 1929–1930 
Continental Aircraft Company 1929–1929
Geselle Aircraft Company 1927–1927
Hilton Aircraft Company 1929–1930 
Jayhawk Aircraft Company 1929–1930 
Knoll Aircraft Company 1928–1929 
Laird Aircraft Company 1928–1928 
Lark Aircraft Company 1928–1928  
Lea Aircraft Company 1930–1930  
Lear Aircraft Company 1929–1930
Mason Aircraft Company - Founded in 1928, and built the Mason Greater Meteor, a near clone of the Spirit of St. Louis for record attempts.
Metal Aircraft Corporation 1929–1929  
Miller Aircraft 1927–1927  
Mooney Aircraft Company 1929–1930  
C.M. Mulkins Company 1929–1929  
Okay Airplane Company 1929–1929  
Poyer Motor Company 1929–1929  
Quick Air Motors 1928–1929  
Roydon Aircraft Company 1930–1930  
Red Bird Aircraft Company 1929–1929  
Rawdon-Burnham Company 1931–1931  
Shilberg Aeroplane Company 1928–1928  
Self Aircraft Corporation 1929–1929  
St. Louis Aircraft Corporation - Came out of dormancy in 1928 to produce the St. Louis C2 Cardinal. Production ceased after the start of the Depression.
Steamboat Aircraft Corporation 1928–1928  
Straughan Aircraft Corporation 
Pawnee and Woodlawn 1932–1933  
Swift Aircraft Corporation 1927–1929  
Sullivan Aircraft Manufacturing Corporation 1929–1930  
Supreme/Stone Propeller Company 1929–1930  
Vanos Aircraft Corporation 1929–1929  
Wichita Airplane Manufacturing Company 1929–1929  
Watkins Aircraft Company 1929–1930 
Vulcan Aircraft Corporation - Developed the Vulcan American Moth Monoplane. Company sold to Davis Aircraft, with production ending by 1932.
Wichita Imblum Aero Corporation 1929–1929  
Yellow Air Cab Company 1929–1930 
Yunker Aircraft Company 1929–1930

Consolidation
Companies were consolidating Lindbergh Boom start-ups at a rapid rate. Some, like Curtiss-Wright, went on a buying spree before the market crash and struggled to maintain control afterward. Others like the Detroit Aircraft Corporation were dissolved.

See also
The "Pioneer Era" (1900–1914)
Roaring Twenties

References

20th-century aviation
Charles Lindbergh
 
1927 in aviation